Shirez Rural District is a rural district (dehestan) in Bisotun District, Harsin County, Kermanshah Province, Iran. At the 2006 census, its population was 5,496, in 1,301 families. The rural district has 13 villages.

References 

Rural Districts of Kermanshah Province
Harsin County